Sega Rally 2 is an arcade racing game developed by Sega AM Annex for the Model 3 arcade hardware. It is the sequel to 1994's Sega Rally Championship. The game was first released in arcades in February 1998, and was later ported by Smilebit to the Sega Dreamcast, becoming one of the console's earliest titles when it was released in Japan on January 28, 1999. The Sega Dreamcast version was released in Europe as a launch title on October 14, 1999, and then in North America on November 27. A PC version was released in Japan and Europe that same year, with the North American release following suit in September 2000, where it was published by Mattel Interactive.

Gameplay
As with the predecessor, Sega Rally Championship, the object of the game is to successfully drive along a track while reaching checkpoints and thus be rewarded with more time to enable the player to reach the goal. Sega Rally 2 added new vehicles, new environment settings for the circuits (including snowy tracks and a course set on an island), as well as including multiple circuits in each environment type. An updated version of the original game's Desert track was also included.

The Dreamcast and PC versions of the game also included a "10-year championship" mode. The Dreamcast version ported using Windows CE, had a frame rate half that of the arcade version.

The Toyota Celica GT-Four ST-205, Lancia Delta HF Integrale and the unlockable Lancia Stratos HF returned from the original game as selectable cars, along with newer Toyota and Lancia cars, as well as cars from Mitsubishi, Subaru, Fiat, Peugeot, Renault, and Ford.

Development
Development on the game began in March 1997, with producer Tetsuya Mizuguchi at the helm. Roughly half of the development personnel were Sega AM Annex staff, with the other half taken from a number of other internal studios at Sega. The team created their own development tools for the project.

The cabinet was designed by Sega AM4.

Reception

The game received favorable reviews on both home platforms according to the review aggregation website GameRankings. Jeff Lundrigan of NextGen said in its January 2000 issue that the Dreamcast version "is not the sort of game you beat. Instead, it beats you." A year later, in its January 2001 issue, Jim Preston called the PC version "a fun and pretty arcade rally game that redirects the blood from your brain to your foot." In Japan, Famitsu gave the Dreamcast version a score of 36 out of 40.

Also in Japan, Game Machine listed the arcade version in their April 15, 1998 issue as the most-successful dedicated arcade game of the month.

The Dreamcast version sold 290,000 units in Japan during 1999.

Notes

References

External links
 Sega Rally 2 at Sega Amusements U.S.A. (archived)
 
 

1998 video games
Arcade video games
Dreamcast games
Multiplayer and single-player video games
Off-road racing video games
Rally racing video games
Sega arcade games
Sega Rosso games
Video game sequels
Video games developed in Japan
Video games scored by Hideki Naganuma
Video games scored by Kenji Eno
Windows games
Empire Interactive games